Cynthia Pepper (born Cynthia Anne Culpepper; September 4, 1940) is an American actress whose principal work was during the early 1960s. She was the star of the 1961–62 television series Margie. She played Midge (a WAC PFC) in Elvis Presley's Kissin' Cousins (1964).

Early years 
Culpepper was born in Los  Angeles on September 4, 1940, the daughter of entertainer Jack Pepper (Edward Jackson Culpepper), and Pepper's second wife, Dawn Stanton. Her mother was a dancer.

After she graduated from Hollywood High School, Pepper worked as a model and typist and took night classes at Los Angeles City College.

Career
At 18 Pepper appeared on an episode of Divorce Court on television. In 1960-61, she was cast as next-door teenager Jean Pearson, the romantic interest of young Mike Douglas in My Three Sons.  The next year, Pepper starred in her own 26-week series, Margie, in the role of the Roaring Twenties teenager Margie Clayton.  Pepper was 21 when Margie began.

In 1965, Pepper was named as the co-star of a new TV series, Sally and Sam, which was "tentatively scheduled" to be broadcast from 9:30 to 10 p.m. Eastern Time on Mondays on CBS.

She also guest starred as Amanda Peterson in an episode of The Addams Family titled, "New Neighbors Meet The Addams Family".

Personal life
On April 17, 1960, Pepper married Mervyn Edwards. They divorced in July, 1968. She next married James M. Pazillo on September 6, 1969. They divorced in 1996. Pepper has one son, Michael L. Edwards and resides in Las Vegas.

References

External links

American television actresses
American film actresses
People from Greater Los Angeles
People from the Las Vegas Valley
1940 births
Living people
20th-century American actresses
21st-century American women
Actresses from Los Angeles